The Infinity Project (TIP) was a British 1990s goa trance band. Members included Raja Ram, Graham Wood and Anjee Sian, with Simon Posford occasionally working with them. Other contributors include Martin Freeland (Man With No Name) and Nick Barber (Doof).

In 1994, Infinity Project members Graham Wood and Raja Ram, along with Ian St Paul founded the record label TIP Records.

Discography
Feeling Weird – TIP Records (1995)
Mystical Experiences – Blue Room (1995)
The Mystery of the Yeti / Mystical Experiences (Reissue) – TIP World (2004)
Mystical Experiences - Avatar Records (2004)

References

	
Musical groups established in 1991
Musical groups disestablished in 1997
British electronic music groups
British techno music groups
British trance music groups
Goa trance musical groups